List of Nursing Colleges in Ghana

Nursing Training Colleges in Ghana are tertiary institutions that award diplomas and undergraduate certificates in Nursing, Midwifery and Medical Assistance.

See also 

 National Accreditation Board (Ghana), Public Nurses Training Colleges
 National Accreditation Board (Ghana), Private Nurses Training Colleges

References 

Nursing and midwifery colleges in Ghana
Ghana